The 2016 UCI Track Cycling World Championships were the World Championships for track cycling in 2016. They took place in London in the Lee Valley VeloPark from 2–6 March 2016.

As the last major track cycling event prior to the 2016 Summer Olympics, the championships were particularly important for cyclists and national teams aiming to qualify for the track cycling competitions at Rio 2016. Hosts Great Britain finished top of the medals table with five gold, one silver and three bronze medals.

Preparations
Tickets prices for the 12 different sessions ranged between £15 and £90, with student and over 60s discounts available. Higher priced tickets were tickets with better seating locations, afternoon (final) sessions and the sessions at the weekend. On 20 February 50,000 tickets were sold, with most of the sessions sold out.

For the championships 200 volunteers were recruited and helped in a variety of roles during set-up and across the event, from programme sellers and accreditation distributors to media and sports.

Schedule
The schedule of events was as follows:

Medal summary

Medal table

Medalists

Notes 
 Riders named in italics did not participate in the medal finals.
 In the Olympics, all shaded events (except the madison) are contested within the omnium only.
 The madison is not contested in the Olympics.

Participating nations

390 cyclists from 45 countries were registered for the championships. The registered riders from Egypt and Morocco did not participate. The number of registered cyclists per nation is shown in parentheses. Note that not all registered riders competed at the championships.

Broadcasting

References

External links
Official website
UCI Website
Official results and starting lists

 
UCI Track Cycling World Championships
UCI Track Cycling World Championships
2016
2016 UCI Track Cycling World Championships
UCI Track Cycling World Championships
Cycle racing in London
UCI Track Cycling World Championships
International cycle races hosted by England
March 2016 sports events in Europe